Brigadier William Marsden Eastman, GC (26 October 1911 – 8 April 1980) was a British Army officer who was awarded the George Cross for bomb disposal work between June and November 1940 on the island of Malta.

Early life and career
Born in Brentford on 26 October 1911, Eastman was educated at Uppingham School and the University of Cambridge. His university studies were interrupted by his father's death, as he had to take over the family dyeing and dry-cleaning business. His knowledge of chemicals learned through this career led to him being recommended for a commission in the Royal Army Ordnance Corps on volunteering shortly before the outbreak of the Second World War. Having then attended the Inspecting Ordnance Officer's course at Bramley, he was embarked for Malta in March 1940.

Bomb disposal work
Between June and November 1940 the island of Malta came under the combined attack from German and Italian airforces. As no Royal Engineer bomb disposal units had yet been formed, the job of attending to unexploded bombs and mines was handled by the Royal Army Ordnance Corps. A high number of unexploded bombs needed defusing and Eastman, along with Robert Jephson Jones rendered safe some 275 devices with rudimentary equipment.

George Cross citation
Notice of his award appeared in the London Gazette on Christmas Eve, 1940.

Post-war career
After the war he commanded the RAOC Training Centre until his retirement in 1966, when he retired with his wife to Malta, where he died, and is buried in the Ta' Braxia Cemetery in Pietà.

Sale of medals
Eastman's medals were sold at auction in 2008. They sold for a then world record amount of £49,450 and were acquired by Eastman's regimental museum.

References

Sources
 George Cross database, Retrieved 19 November 2007.

Royal Army Ordnance Corps officers
British recipients of the George Cross
Bomb disposal personnel
British Army personnel of World War II
People educated at Uppingham School
1911 births
1980 deaths
Military personnel from London
British Army brigadiers